RLUA may refer to:
 TRNA pseudouridine32 synthase, an enzyme
 23S rRNA pseudouridine746 synthase, an enzyme